Kazeya Dam is a concrete gravity dam located in Nara prefecture in Japan. The dam is used for power production. The catchment area of the dam is 553 km2. The dam impounds about 446  ha of land when full and can store 130000 thousand cubic meters of water. The construction of the dam was started on 1954 and completed in 1960.

References

Dams in Nara Prefecture
1960 establishments in Japan